Carlos Ephriam Torres (born October 22, 1982) is an American former professional baseball pitcher. He played in Major League Baseball (MLB) for the Chicago White Sox, Colorado Rockies, New York Mets, Milwaukee Brewers, Washington Nationals, and Detroit Tigers and for the Yomiuri Giants of Nippon Professional Baseball (NPB).

Early life
Carlos Torres was born in Santa Cruz, California after his father, Jose, emigrated from Zacatecas, Mexico. As a child, Torres moved from house to house in Santa Cruz County's "south county" agricultural region where his father looked for work to support his five children. Before focusing on baseball, Torres lettered in four sports (baseball, football, basketball and track and field) at Aptos High School, graduating in 2000. His father encouraged his playing sports in order to keep him active and out of trouble.

Career

College
Torres first began his collegiate career at Allan Hancock College then moved up north to San Jose City College before transferring to San Jose State University, pitching in 20 games, (starting seven) in 2003. He ultimately transferred to Kansas State University in 2004, pitching in 16 games, (15 starts), compiling an ERA of 4.12.

Chicago White Sox
Torres was drafted in the 15th round, 449th overall, in the 2004 MLB Draft by the Chicago White Sox and signed for $1,000. He worked his way up through the White Sox minor league system, before making his Major League debut on July 22, 2009 against the Tampa Bay Rays. Prior to his call-up Torres had posted an 8-4 record with a 2.20 ERA with the White Sox' Triple-A affiliate, the Charlotte Knights. Scheduled starter John Danks had a blister on his index finger. Torres pitched six strong innings, giving up three runs on two homers and striking out three to record a quality start. On September 3, Torres picked up his first major league victory by defeating Ryan Dempster and the Chicago Cubs 5-0 in a make-up game at Wrigley Field.

Yomiuri Giants
The Yomiuri Giants signed Torres to a contract on November 16, 2010. At the beginning of the season, Torres was expected to compete for a place in the starting rotation. He earned his first Nippon Professional Baseball win on July 28, 2011 against the Yokohama BayStars.

Colorado Rockies
On December 20, 2011, Torres signed a minor league deal with the Colorado Rockies. On August 12, 2012, Torres got his first career base hit, an RBI single off George Kontos of the San Francisco Giants.

New York Mets

Torres signed with the New York Mets on November 20, 2012. In 33 games for the team, Torres compiled 86.1 IP, 4-6, 3.44 ERA, 75 K's, and 1.12 WHIP. During the 2014 season, Torres appeared in a career-high 73 games, while compiling a record of 8-6, 3.06 ERA, 96 K's and 1.31 WHIP in 97.0 IP.

For the 2015 season, Torres appeared in 59 games, while compiling a record of 5-6, 4.68 ERA, 48 K's and 1.37 WHIP in 57.2 IP.

On January 22, 2016, Torres was designated for assignment by the Mets. On January 30, the Mets placed Torres on waivers. Torres cleared waivers on the next day and elected free agency.

Atlanta Braves
The Atlanta Braves signed Torres to a minor league contract on February 10, 2016. He was released on March 31, 2016.

Milwaukee Brewers
On April 2, 2016, Torres signed a one-year major league deal with the Milwaukee Brewers. He was outrighted to AAA and elected free agency on November 2, 2017.

Cleveland Indians
Torres signed a minor league contract with the Cleveland Indians on February 22, 2018. The deal included an invitation to the Indians' major league spring training camp. Torres was released by the Indians on March 24, 2018.

Washington Nationals
On March 28, 2018, Torres signed a minor league deal with the Washington Nationals, who assigned him to the Syracuse Chiefs in the Class AAA International League. He appeared in four games for the Chiefs, pitching five scoreless innings. On April 20, 2018, the Nationals selected his contract from Syracuse and placed him on their 25-man roster. He appeared in 10 games for the Nationals, pitching to a 6.52 ERA over 9 innings. The Nationals designated him for assignment on May 23, 2018. He declared free agency on October 2, 2018.

San Diego Padres
On January 17, 2019, Torres signed a minor league deal with the San Diego Padres that included an invitation to spring training. On May 15, 2019, he opted out of his contract and became a free agent.

Detroit Tigers
On May 26, 2019, Torres signed a minor league contract with the Detroit Tigers. On June 8, 2019, Torres was recalled by the Tigers. He was designated for assignment on June 22 after recording a 7.50 ERA in four appearances. Torres later elected free agency on June 24.

Minnesota Twins
On June 25, 2019, Torres signed a minor league deal with the Minnesota Twins. On July 24, the Twins selected Torres' contract. On July 28, Torres was designated for assignment.

San Francisco Giants
On August 5, 2019, Torres signed a minor league deal with the Giants. On August 28, Torres was released.

Toros de Tijuana
On February 26, 2020, Torres signed with the Toros de Tijuana of the Mexican League. In 2020, he did not play a game because of the cancellation of the Mexican League season due to the COVID-19 pandemic.
After the 2020 season, he played for Tomateros de Culiacán of the Mexican Pacific League(LVMP). He also played for Mexico in the 2021 Caribbean Series.

On December 9, 2022, Torres retired from professional baseball.

References

External links

1982 births
Living people
American baseball players of Mexican descent
American expatriate baseball players in Japan
Baseball players from California
Birmingham Barons players
Bristol White Sox players
Charlotte Knights players
Chicago White Sox players
Colorado Rockies players
Colorado Springs Sky Sox players
Detroit Tigers players
El Paso Chihuahuas players
Great Falls White Sox players
Kannapolis Intimidators players
Kansas State Wildcats baseball players
Las Vegas 51s players
Major League Baseball pitchers
Milwaukee Brewers players
National baseball team players
New York Mets players
Peoria Saguaros players
Rochester Red Wings players
Sacramento River Cats players
San Jose State Spartans baseball players
Sportspeople from Santa Cruz, California
Syracuse Chiefs players
Toledo Mud Hens players
Toros de Tijuana players
Washington Nationals players
Winston-Salem Warthogs players
Yomiuri Giants players
2017 World Baseball Classic players